The NSW Open Challenger is a tennis tournament held in Sydney, Australia, since 2006. The event is part of the ATP Challenger Tour and the ITF Women's Circuit, and is played on hard courts.

Past finals

Men's singles

Men's doubles

Women's singles

Women's doubles

References

External links

 
ATP Challenger Tour
ITF Women's World Tennis Tour
Tennis tournaments in Australia
Hard court tennis tournaments
Recurring sporting events established in 2006
Tennis in New South Wales
Defunct tennis tournaments in Australia